A by-election was held in the state electoral district of Blacktown on 18 August 1945. The by-election was triggered by the death of Frank Hill.

Dates

Results

Frank Hill died. Preferences were not distributed.

See also
Electoral results for the district of Blacktown
List of New South Wales state by-elections

References

1945 elections in Australia
New South Wales state by-elections
1940s in New South Wales
August 1945 events in Australia